Carlo Leoni (13 March 1955, Rome) is an Italian politician.

After a long time as an activist and director of the Partito Comunista Italiano (PCI) and of the Democratici di Sinistra (DS), he became a deputy in the Italian Chamber of Deputies in 1996, and was re-elected to that role in 2001 and 2006.

In the XIV Legislatura he became the DS's capogruppo on the Commission on Institutional Affairs of the Chamber and a member of the Bicameral Anti-mafia Commission.  On 4 May 2006 he was elected vice-president of the Chamber of Deputies.

Following the 4th Congress of the DS, which sanctioned the birth of the Partito Democratico, Leoni left the DS and joined the Sinistra Democratica.

External links
Homepage

Living people
1955 births
Politicians from Rome
Italian Communist Party politicians
20th-century Italian politicians